Monroe is an unincorporated community in Overton County, Tennessee, United States. The zipcode is 38573.  Monroe is located along State Route 111 northeast of Livingston and southwest of Byrdstown. 

Monroe's zipcode also extends into Pickett County.

Notes

Unincorporated communities in Overton County, Tennessee
Unincorporated communities in Tennessee